Alfred Amory George (20 April 1854 – 13 October 1930) was a New Zealand journalist, newspaper proprietor and editor, and printer. He was born in London, England, on 20 April 1854.

References

1854 births
1930 deaths
New Zealand journalists
English emigrants to New Zealand